René Huguenin (born 9 August 1944) is a retired Swiss professional ice hockey player who played for HC La Chaux-de-Fonds in the National League A. He also represented the Swiss national team at the 1972 Winter Olympics.

References

External links
René Huguenin's stats at Sports-Reference.com

1944 births
Living people
HC La Chaux-de-Fonds players
Ice hockey players at the 1972 Winter Olympics
Olympic ice hockey players of Switzerland
Swiss ice hockey defencemen